Tokyo International School is an international school in Minami Azabu, Minato, Tokyo, Japan.

It was founded in 1997 by parents who wanted to provide an education for their children. The school contains a pre-school, elementary and middle school with a total student population of approximately 360 students, representing over 60 nationalities. The 50 full-time faculty members come from 13 countries. Instruction is in English and the school follows the International Baccalaureate Organization curriculum guidelines. It is accredited by New England Association of Schools and Colleges and the Council of International Schools. TIS is also a Columbia University Readers and Writers 'Project' school. This means it receives regular visits on an annual basis from teacher trainers from Columbia University. Admission guidelines are designed to ensure each class has no more than 20 students. Located in the Minami Azabu area of central Tokyo, it is one of the few internationally accredited international schools in the center of the city. The TIS Mission is to 'To nurture confident, open-minded, independently thinking, and well-balanced inquirers for global responsibility'.
The Good Schools Guide International called it "A lively, imaginative school."

History
In 1997, American-Japanese husband and wife Patrick Newell and Ikuko Tsuboya-Newell started Tokyo International School to provide an education for their two daughters. Starting with 12 students and one classroom, the school moved twice in the Meguro area of Tokyo before moving to Shirokane in 2000. In March 2004, due to a growing number of students, the school moved to a new location in Tamachi, the site of the recently vacated Nankai Elementary School. The schoolyard was resurfaced and the building was reinforced and painted a distinctive blue, orange, and yellow before the school moved in. After ten years at the Tamachi location, in August 2013 the school moved to its current location in Minami-Azabu.

Students
Students at Tokyo International School come from over 3 countries. No nationality makes up more than 20% of the student body. Most students are children of expatriate parents working for multi-national companies or foreign diplomatic missions in Tokyo on 2-5 year posts.

Teachers 
The Teachers at Tokyo International School generally have lived in 2-3 countries with most being from the United States. The school is planning to remove kindergarten from the 2023–2024 school year to replace with 11th grade.

References

Community: Family. Tokyo International School. (2022, July 11). Retrieved November 1, 2022, from https://tokyois.com/community/#school-board

External links 

Tokyo International School official site

Elementary schools in Japan
Private schools in Tokyo
International schools in Tokyo
International Baccalaureate schools in Japan
Minato, Tokyo